Anzor Ruslanovich Khizriev (born 31 October 1990 in Chechnya) is a Russian freestyle wrestler of Chechen descent, who competes in the 125 kg weight category. Senior European Games gold medalist 2019, he came in 5th at the 2018 World Championships.

Background
Khizriev was born in Chechnya, but at the age of five his family fled to St. Petersburg, Leningrad Oblast after the First Chechen War erupted. He started training in freestyle wrestling in primary school, but in the high school years he retired. After finishing Saint Petersburg State Medical Academy study he got the degree in surgery and returned to wrestling.

Wrestling career

Khizriev represents Leningrad Oblast in Russian national championships. He is two-times Russian national champion. He represented the Russian Federation at the World Championships 2017 and 2018.

At Ivan Yarygin 2019 he beat Olympic gold medalist and 2-time world champion Taha Akgül of Turkey.

Championships and achievements
2016 Russian nationals – 3rd.
2017 Russian nationals champion.
2018 Russian nationals champion.
2020 Russian nationals – 3rd.
2021 Russian nationals – 3rd.
2014 Ivan Yarygin Grand-Prix – 2nd.
2016 Ivan Yarygin Grand-Prix – 3rd.
2018 Ivan Yarygin Grand-Prix – 2nd.
2019 Ivan Yarygin Grand-Prix – 1st.
2021 Ivan Yarygin Grand-Prix – 1st.
2017 World Championships – 5th.
2018 World Championships – 5th.

References

External links 
 

1990 births
Living people
Russian male sport wrestlers
Chechen sportsmen
Sportspeople from Saint Petersburg
European Games gold medalists for Russia
Wrestlers at the 2019 European Games
European Games medalists in wrestling
European Wrestling Championships medalists
21st-century Russian people